Kim Ye-ryeong (born Kim Yoon-mi on March 17, 1966) is a South Korean actress.

Filmography

Television series

Film

Variety shows

Theater

Awards and nominations

References

External links
 Kim Ye-ryeong Fan Cafe at Daum 
 
 
 

1966 births
Living people
South Korean television actresses
South Korean film actresses
South Korean stage actresses
Dankook University alumni
People from Seoul